Hurricane How was the only tropical cyclone to make landfall on the United States in 1951. It was the eighth storm of the season, forming on September 28 in the northwest Caribbean and, after entering the Gulf of Mexico, turned eastward and became a tropical storm. The storm brought heavy rainfall to Florida, causing flooding and $2 million in damage. Tropical Storm How later became a hurricane, passing near the Outer Banks of North Carolina where it produced strong winds and high tides. A ship called the "Southern Isles" capsized off Cape Hatteras, killing 17 out of the crew of 23. Rains and high tides occurred in southeastern New England, before the hurricane moved out to sea and became extratropical.

Meteorological history

The origins of Hurricane How were from an easterly wave that organized into a tropical depression, in the western Caribbean Sea on September 28, 1951. It moved to the north-northwest, passing by the Yucatan peninsula before turning to the east in the central Gulf of Mexico on October 1. That day, a reconnaissance aircraft in the system reported gale-force winds and, as a result, it was upgraded to Tropical Storm How. The storm strengthened to just below hurricane force, making landfall near Punta Gorda, Florida with  winds (115 km/h). While it crossed the state, the center was not very organized, and consequently the strongest winds were in the south and southeastern portion of the storm; heavy rains, however, fell across its path.

Tropical Storm How emerged into the Atlantic Ocean near Vero Beach, quickly intensifying to hurricane strength by October 3. Subsequently, the hurricane embarked on a slow weakening trend, as it briefly posed a threat to New England. It passed southeast of Cape Cod before turning more to the east-northeast. It became an extratropical storm on October 7, and the next day the remnants of How dissipated in the far northern Atlantic.

Impact and records
As the storm was not very well-organized when it crossed Florida, the strongest winds were not near the center, and instead were confined to squalls in the Florida Keys and the southeast coast. Wind damage was minor, confined to a few broken windows and the sinking or damaging of some small craft. Nevertheless, heavy rainfall occurred along its path. The highest total was  near Bonita Springs, near where it moved ashore.

Further north, the hurricane threatened to strike or move very close to the Outer Banks. Hurricane warnings were posted from Cape Hatteras to Manteo, and ships were advised to remain at port. Hurricane How produced  winds and high tides along the Outer Banks and southeastern Virginia. Some minor damage was reported, and two ships were washed ashore. In New England, the Weather Bureau issued storm warnings from Block Island, Rhode Island to Portland, Maine, with rains, fog, and heavy surf reported. Several roads were closed in Massachusetts due to the tides.

Offshore, a ship called Southern Isle was wrecked by the high surf. It had been sailing from Puerto Rico with a full load of iron ore and, as it approached the hurricane, the vessel changed directions and slowed. By October 5, winds were strong and the seas were moderately rough. Very quickly, the ship broke into two, which prevented any time to escape on lifeboats. By the day after the wreck, rescue boats and helicopters found seven people, one of whom later died from their injuries. Ultimately, 17 people died in the event.

Overall, Hurricane How caused about $2 million (USD) in damage. It was the only storm to strike the United States during the year, and consequently, 1951 had the least tropical cyclone damage in the United States since the 1939 season.

See also

1951 Atlantic hurricane season

References

1951 Atlantic hurricane season
Category 2 Atlantic hurricanes
Hurricanes in Florida
Hurricanes in North Carolina
Hurricanes in New England